Roman Sergeyevich Zhdanov (born 30 June 1998) is a Russian Paralympic swimmer. He is a three-time Paralympic champion, five-time World champion and one-time European champion.

Career
Zhdanov represented the Russian Paralympic Committee athletes at the 2020 Summer Paralympics where he won gold medals in the 50 metre breaststroke SB3, 50 metre backstroke S4, and 150 metre individual medley SM4 events, setting three world records.

References

1998 births
Living people
Paralympic swimmers of Russia
Paralympic gold medalists for the Russian Paralympic Committee athletes
Paralympic bronze medalists for the Russian Paralympic Committee athletes
Paralympic medalists in swimming
Swimmers at the 2016 Summer Paralympics
Swimmers at the 2020 Summer Paralympics
Medalists at the 2020 Summer Paralympics
Medalists at the World Para Swimming Championships
Medalists at the World Para Swimming European Championships
Russian male backstroke swimmers
Russian male breaststroke swimmers
Russian male freestyle swimmers
Russian male medley swimmers
S4-classified Paralympic swimmers
20th-century Russian people
21st-century Russian people